North Carolina Highway 22 (NC 22) is a North Carolina state highway that runs in the central-north region of the state. It runs between Southern Pines and Climax.

Route description
NC 22 begins at a roundabout at the junction with NC 2, just shy of the interchange at US 1 in Southern Pines. It heads north along Central Drive and then runs independently after the roundabout at Airport Road. NC 22 then runs concurrent with US 15/US 501 for about  before entering Carthage from the south. NC 22 then heads north again, passing through High Falls before it meets NC 42. From there, NC 22 becomes concurrent with NC 42 heading into Coleridge and intersects the western terminus of NC 902 south of Bennett. After entering Coleridge, NC 22 splits from NC 42 and heads north into Ramseur. It meets US 64 and runs concurrent with it along Jordan Road before heading west through Franklinville. The route continues north until it reaches its northern terminus at the junction of NC 62 in Climax.

History

Original NC 22

The original NC 22 appeared in 1922, running from NC 20 in Whiteville northward toward Fayetteville where it ended at NC 40.
1925: NC 22 is realigned coming out of Fayetteville, now going straight southward through Lumberton and then to the South Carolina state border, where it becomes SC 23.
1927: US 217's new routing makes the entire NC 22 route also part of that highway.
1932: US 301 replaces US 217 on NC 22.
2004: A seven-mile (11 km) segment of NC 22 north of Climax is truncated as a result of the construction of the I-85 Greensboro Bypass. NC 22's former northern terminus at US 421 was eliminated. This truncated segment of NC 22 went through the town Pleasant Garden.

Current route

1934: With US 301's entire route being NC 22, the number could be better assigned elsewhere. With the arrival of US 64, NC 22 was reassigned to NC 64. It was then a much shorter highway, running from NC 27 in Carthage to US 421 in Greensboro, North Carolina.
1952: NC 22's southern end is aligned to its current ending in Southern Pines.
2004: NC 22 is shortened just west of 421 to NC 62 in Climax. Apparently, I-85's relocation to the new southern Greensboro bypass cut off NC 22 from US 421.

Major intersections

References

022
Interstate 85
Transportation in Moore County, North Carolina
Transportation in Chatham County, North Carolina
Transportation in Randolph County, North Carolina
Transportation in Guilford County, North Carolina